Gymnospermium albertii (syn. Leontice alberti) is a species in the genus Gymnospermium in the family Berberidaceae.

Description
Tuberous perennial.
Height: Flowering stems to about 15 cm high.
Leaves: Lobed, with five leaflets. Leaves are bronze-tinged and rolled lengthways when young, expanding and turning pale green with maturity.
Inflorescences:
Raceme: Pendent at first, later becoming upright. Densely flowered.
Flowers: Each flower measures up to 2.5 cm (1 in) in diameter when fully open, but they are more frequently seen in the earlier bell-shaped stage of openness. Flowers are bright yellow with a coppery red exterior.

Range
Native to rocky hillsides in Soviet Central Asia (Uzbekistan, Tajikistan, Turkmenistan, and Kazakhstan).

Cultivation
Easily raised from seed. Very hardy. Successful in open, well-drained soil. Grows well in unheated glasshouses.

Etymology
Gymnospermium derived from Greek, meaning 'naked seed'. Albertii is named for Johann Albert Von Regel, collector of the type specimen and son of the author of the species, Eduard August von Regel.

Gallery

References

Berberidaceae
Flora of Central Asia